George Peter Foster (April 3, 1858 – November 11, 1928) was a U.S. representative from Illinois.

Born in Dover, New Jersey, Foster moved to Chicago, Illinois in 1867. He attended the public schools and the University of Chicago. He was graduated from Union College of Law at Chicago in 1882. He was admitted to the bar the same year and commenced practice in Chicago. He was in the Justice of the Peace for the town of South Chicago 1891-1899. He was acting police magistrate of the principal police court of the city 1893-1899.

Foster was elected as a Democrat to the Fifty-sixth, Fifty-seventh, and Fifty-eighth Congresses (March 4, 1899 – March 3, 1905). He was an unsuccessful candidate for reelection in 1904. He resumed the practice of law. He served as assistant corporation counsel of Chicago from 1912 to 1922. He retired from active pursuits in 1928 and moved to Wheaton, Illinois, where he died November 11, 1928. He was interred in Calvary Cemetery in Chicago.

References

1858 births
1928 deaths
People from Dover, New Jersey
Northwestern University Pritzker School of Law alumni
Politicians from Chicago
People from Wheaton, Illinois
Democratic Party members of the United States House of Representatives from Illinois
Burials at Calvary Cemetery (Evanston, Illinois)